Tule is an unincorporated community in Humboldt County, Nevada, United States.

Tule was a station east of Weso on the Southern Pacific Railroad with the first reference from a 1881 map.  The name comes from the Nahuatl word "tollin", which means bullrush.

An 1890 book includes Tule in a list of towns and settlements in Humboldt County.

Notes

Unincorporated communities in Humboldt County, Nevada
Unincorporated communities in Nevada